A War You Cannot Win is the sixth studio album by American metalcore band All That Remains. The album was released on November 6, 2012 through Razor & Tie.

The album has some tracks which have a melodic metalcore sound and some with a standard metal sound which have only singing.

Album sold over 25,000 copies in the United States in its first week of release to land at position No. 13 on The Billboard 200 chart. As of February 2015, the album has sold 123,000 copies in the United States.

Background
The album was produced by Killswitch Engage guitarist Adam Dutkiewicz, who has produced albums for the band in the past.

The first song to be released from the album was "Down Through the Ages". The song was first posted to Labonte's YouTube channel on August 13, 2012. "Stand Up" was released as the next single on August 27. On October 26, "You Can't Fill My Shadow" was announced as the album's third single.

But the fifth and last single, "What If I Was Nothing", was the real banger of all the album. A power ballad which has already reached 84 million views in YouTube, in this song Philip Labonte talks about some of his problems with his wife.

Musical style
Drummer Jason Costa stated about the album: "This is a very guitar, very melody-oriented album. It wasn't very rhythm-based at all. I would just say it's metal; it's a metal album. We've got some heavy songs on there, some heavy, groovy songs on there. We've got some fast, heavy songs on there, we've got some more radio-friendly, melodic songs on there. It's typical ALL THAT REMAINS, really, but we've definitely stepped up the musicianship there and the writing."

Track listing

Personnel

All That Remains
 Philip Labonte – lead vocals
 Oli Herbert – lead guitar
 Mike Martin – rhythm guitar
 Jeanne Sagan – bass guitar, backing vocals
 Jason Costa – drums

Production
 Adam Dutkiewicz – production, engineering
 Jim Fogarty – assistant engineering
 Brian Virtue – mixing at Modernist Movement Studios, Nashville, Tennessee
 Brad Blackwood – mastering at Euphonic Masters

Management
 Stephen Hutton and Bert Landry for Uppercut Management
 Josh Kline – booking for The Agency Group
 Murray Richman and Nathan Richman – business management for Richman Business Management
 Mike McKoy – legal representation for Serling, Rooks, Ferrara, McKoy & Worob LLP
 Beau King – production, concert lighting and tour management
 Pete Giberga – A&R
 John Franck – marketing direction

Artwork
 P.R. Brown – photography and design

Charts

References

All That Remains (band) albums
2012 albums
Razor & Tie albums
Albums produced by Adam Dutkiewicz